The Australian National Wildlife Collection (ANWC) is a collection of almost 200,000 zoological specimens, including skeletons, skins, spirit specimens, birds’ eggs, frozen tissue samples and a wildlife sound library, mainly of vertebrate animals from Australia and Papua New Guinea, which are stored in a secure, climate-controlled facility.  It is based at CSIRO Sustainable Ecosystems Division in the Australian Capital Territory.

History
The ANWC was established in 1966, though its origins date from the late 1950s when scientists in the CSIRO's Wildlife Survey section were collecting specimens in the course of their work and were concerned that their individual collections should not be dispersed and should be accessible at a central location for long-term security and so that comparative studies could be made.  The decision to establish a central facility was made by Harold Frith, Chief of the Division of Wildlife.  The founding Curator, later Director, was Richard Schodde, who held the post for nearly thirty years.  It was formally recognised and named the Australian National Wildlife Collection in 1976 through gazettal by the Government of Australia.

References
 Australian National Wildlife Collection

Biological research institutes in Australia
Zoology organizations
1966 establishments in Australia
CSIRO